The Baining people are among the earliest continuously located inhabitants of the Gazelle Peninsula of East New Britain, Papua New Guinea; they currently live in the Baining Mountains, from which they take their name. The Baining are thought to have been driven to this area in comparatively recent times by the Tolai tribes who migrated to the coastal areas. The Baining migration inland may also have been influenced by major volcanic activity taking place over the centuries around the present day town of Rabaul on the north-east coast.

Baining languages

The Baining languages are a distinct language family spoken by the Baining. They are possibly related to the Taulil–Butam languages as well as to extinct Makolkol.

The languages, which correspond to clan groups, are:
Mali (2,200 speakers)
Qaqet (6,400 speakers)
Kairak (900 speakers)
Simbali (450 speakers)
Ura (1,900 speakers)

Makolkol neighbored the (other) Baining languages to their southwest.

The label 'Baining' was originally applied to speakers of Qaqet, the first group in regular contact with administrators and missionaries, and the language family was originally classed as dialects of a single language. The wider genetic affiliation of the languages is unclear and they are usually classed negatively as non-Austronesian and non-Oceanic.

History and culture
The Baining people are likely the original inhabitants of the Gazelle peninsula. Their more recent history was defined by the arrival on the coast of Tolai immigrants, who subjugated adjacent Baining communities and subjected others to raids. With the additional stress of epidemics and forced acculturation, mid 20th century missionaries spoke of the Baining as a "dying" people, but the community has since recovered. Colonial administrators forced the Baining into settled villages, changing their previous semi-nomadic lifestyle, though their cultivation methods remained mostly unchanged.

The Baining are swidden (slash-and-burn) cultivators whose main traditional crop is taro: the 1957 taro blight caused considerable disruption to Baining agriculture, resulting in the replacement of most taro crops by singapu or kong-kong taro. Attempts to introduce bananas, beans and other staple crops to Baining villages were generally resisted, although a variety of other vegetables are grown alongside taro. Baining garden plots are very productive: they are often at some distance from villages and are provided with shelters in which people can stay temporarily.

Ethnographers have noted that, similar to Samoans, Baining culture places little emphasis on attributes given a high value in the West, such as individualism and emotional expression, and instead focuses on an egalitarian outer social world where there is a strong commitment to the good of the community. Baining people have been described as having a culture which values work, and encouraging children to mature quickly by discouraging them from playing. They have been described as one of the few, if not the only, groups to restrict the younger members of society from playing. This assessment has been challenged by several ethnographers, and even Baining villagers themselves, who have confirmed that Baining children play regularly (including in local streams and in team sports) and that there is no general custom of punishing children for playing.

This supposed characteristic has contributed to a common modern Western perception that the Baining have a "dull" or "Puritan" culture focusing only on practical work and lacking symbolic logic, religion, and artistic expression: to some degree this mirrors early colonial-era studies which characterised them as a primitive 'Stone Age' people whose land was ripe for Western or Melanesian settlement. This modern "primitivist caricature" ignores studies which have described the Baining as having a very rich cultural life, being based largely on two earlier "failed ethnographic projects" by Gregory Bateson and Jeremy Pool, both of whom failed to communicate effectively with the people they were studying.

A more recent study by Jane Fajans notes that existing ethnographic methods are poor tools to analyse Baining culture, but fails to consider that the Baining people themselves may deliberately obscure religious, cultural and artistic traditions to 'outsiders'. Online comment following an article by Thomas Hylland Eriksen, characterising the Baining as the "dullest culture" and based heavily on Fajans' work, was made almost entirely by writers unfamiliar with the Baining themselves or even with most of their ethnographers.

The Baining have a long history of localistic millenarian cults, notably Pomio Kivung, although the main leaders of the latter have been Mengen speakers. Several Baining villages have formed "proudly local" secessionist movements criticising Mengen cultural hegemony, while still following the main Kivung movement's structure.

Art

The best-known aspect of Baining artistic culture are night dance ceremonies, often called "fire dances", during which the dancers run through, leap over and kick the embers of a fire. The dances originated in Qaqet (northern) villages, where they were called atut, but have since been taken up by central and southern Baining. The dancers wear large masks laboriously made from bark cloth, bamboo and leaves: the masks are used just once for the firedance ceremony before being thrown away or destroyed. Masks are of two main types: in Kairak areas these are the kavat and the larger vungvung, the latter featuring an axial bamboo pole up to thirteen feet in length, and traditionally represented various male-associated animals and plants of the forest.

The origin of these fire dance ceremonies was to celebrate the birth of new children; the commencement of harvests and also a way of remembering the dead: in the late 20th century tourism has encouraged their revival. The Baining firedance is also a rite of passage for initiating young men into adulthood; during the ceremony the dancers are considered to be possessed by anthropomorphised animal spirits or masalai that enhance the dancer's own masculinity. The dancers are accompanied by an all-male 'orchestra' of percussion instruments, and take turns parading through the dance ground: as the tempo increases the dancers will briefly dance through a large central bonfire. The dances last until daybreak, when members of the accompanying 'orchestra' chase the masks out of the dance grounds.

The fire dance is a men-only event and traditionally the Baining women and children neither partake nor watch, although the women often perform secret night rituals and dances to "cool" the main ritual site beforehand. In recent times the fire dance has become an essential part of local and international cultural festivals and a major draw to tourists: this has led the Baining to adopt it as a symbol of their cultural identity, using its iconic status as leverage to emphasise their differences from the Tolai.

References
 Fajans, Jane. They Make Themselves: Work and Play Among the Baining of Papua New Guinea. Chicago: University of Chicago Press, 1997. 
 Pool, Gail. Lost Among the Baining: Adventure, Marriage, and Other Fieldwork. Columbia: University of Missouri Press, 2015.

References 

Ethnic groups in Papua New Guinea